Smirnenski is a village in Brusartsi Municipality, Montana Province, north-western Bulgaria.

References

Villages in Montana Province